Nishada rotundipennis is a moth of the family Erebidae first described by Francis Walker in 1862. It is found on Borneo and Peninsular Malaysia and in Myanmar and the north-eastern Himalayas. The habitat consists of forests.

Adults are sexually dimorphic, with females being much paler and yellower than males. Males also have slightly swollen antennae.

References

Lithosiina
Moths described in 1862